Michel Think (born 24 April 1960) is a Luxembourgian sports shooter. He competed in the mixed trap event at the 1992 Summer Olympics.

References

External links
 

1960 births
Living people
Luxembourgian male sport shooters
Olympic shooters of Luxembourg
Shooters at the 1992 Summer Olympics
People from Dudelange